Let's Rock Again! is a music documentary film following Joe Strummer as he tours across the United States and Japan with his band the Mescaleros promoting their second album Global a Go-Go. The memoir was shot by filmmaker and longtime Strummer friend Dick Rude in the 18 months leading up to Strummer's death in 2002.

In light of Strummer's death, the film is "inevitably sad to watch now," as The Guardian wrote in a review, but still inspirational in its portrayal of "a star of rare humility".

DVD
The DVD was released in June 2006. Bonus features include:
 
 Interviews with Joe Strummer
 Behind-the-scenes footage
 Joe's Suitcase [Slide Show]
 Q & A with director Dick Rude
 Five songs performed live:

 "Bigger They Come, Harder They Fall"
 "Quarter Pound an Ishens"
 "Armagideon Time"
 "Pressure Drop '72"
 "Rudie Can't Fail"

Scene selections include:
 Tom Snyder and The Clash
 1977 (The Clash)
 1 October 2002, Tokyo, Japan
 Main Title; Global a Go-Go
 Bhindi Bhagee
 Interaction with the Fans
 Quarter Pound an Ishens
 Trashman or Doorman?
 From Hero to Zero
 London's Burning
 Word of Mouth
 Mega Bottle Ride
 Drumming Up Business
 Get Down Moses
 Backstage Shenanigans
 Shaktar Donetsk
 Songwriting and Lyrics
 Cool 'n' Out
 9 October 2001, New York, NY
 Minstrel Boy
 Going Underground
 1969
 Johnny Appleseed
 End Credits

See also 
 Joe Strummer and the Mescaleros
 Joe Strummer

References

External links
 
 Preview Trailer: from the Rude Archive
 
 

Rockumentaries
The Clash
Documentary films about punk music and musicians
2004 films
2004 documentary films
American documentary films
2000s English-language films
2000s American films